"How About Me?" is a popular song written by Irving Berlin in 1928. The song is an expression of sorrow over a love affair that is over. 
The first recording by Fred Waring's Pennsylvanians (vocal by Clare Hanlon) was popular in 1928 and the song has subsequently been recorded by many artists.

Notable recordings
Judy Garland - Alone (1957)
Ella Fitzgerald - Ella Fitzgerald Sings the Irving Berlin Songbook (1958)
Judy Holliday - Trouble Is a Man (1958).
Julie London - Around Midnight (1960)
Sue Raney - All By Myself (1964).
Barbra Streisand - The Way We Were (1974)
Rosemary Clooney - Rosemary Clooney Sings the Music of Irving Berlin (1984)
Ernie Andrews - How About Me (2006)

References

Songs written by Irving Berlin
1928 songs
Nancy Wilson (jazz singer) songs
Judy Garland songs